The 2011–12 New Zealand Figure Skating Championships was held at the Ice Sports Southland in Gore from 11 through 16 November 2011. Skaters competed in the disciplines of men's singles, ladies' singles, and pair skating across many levels, including senior, junior, novice, adult, and the pre-novice disciplines of juvenile, pre-primary, primary, and intermediate.

Senior results

Men

Ladies

Pairs

External links
 2011–12 New Zealand Figure Skating Championships results

2011 in figure skating
New Zealand Figure Skating Championships
Figure Skating
November 2011 sports events in New Zealand